HAT-P-25 is a G-type main-sequence star about 990 light-years away. It has a very low flare activity. The star is enriched in heavy elements, having about twice amount of metals compared to solar abundance.

Planetary system
In 2010 a transiting hot Jupiter like planet was detected. It has an equilibrium temperature of 1182 K. The stability of orbits within circumstellar habitable zone is not significantly affected by the HAT-P-25b planet.

References

Aries (constellation)
G-type main-sequence stars
Planetary systems with one confirmed planet
Planetary transit variables